The 19601 / 19602 Udaipur City–New Jalpaiguri Weekly Express is an express train belonging to North Western Railway zone that runs between  and  in India. It is currently operated with 19601/19602 train numbers on a weekly basis.

Service 
The 19601/Udaipur City–New Jalpaiguri Weekly Express has an average speed of 51 km/hr and covers 2,238 km in 42h 15m.
The 19602/New Jalpaiguri–Udaipur City Weekly Express has an average speed of 51 km/hr and covers 2,238 km in 43h 40m.

Route & Halts 
The important halts of the train are:
 
 
 
 
 
 
 
 
 
 
 
 
 
 
 Deoria Sadar
 
 
 
 
 
 
 
 

This train will start stopping at Bareilly Junction from March 2019 onwards.

Coach composition
The train has standard ICF rakes with a maximum speed of 110 kmph. The train consists of 22 coaches:
 2 AC II tier
 4 AC III tier
 8 sleeper coaches
 6 general unreserved
 2 seating cum luggage rake

Traction
Both trains are hauled by a Ghaziabad based WAP-7 electric locomotive from Udaipur to New Jalpaiguri and vice versa.

Direction reversal
The train reverses its direction once, at

See also 
 Shalimar–Udaipur City Weekly Express
 Ananya Express

References

Notes

External links 
 19601/Udaipur City–New Jalpaiguri Weekly Express India Rail Info
 19602/New Jalpaiguri–Udaipur City Weekly Express India Rail Info

Transport in Siliguri
Transport in Jalpaiguri
Transport in Udaipur
Rail transport in West Bengal
Rail transport in Haryana
Rail transport in Bihar
Rail transport in Uttar Pradesh
Rail transport in Delhi
Rail transport in Rajasthan
Express trains in India